Ramappa Lake is a lake situated in Warangal district, Telangana, India. The lake is one of the prominent reservoirs built by Kakatiya rulers. It is situated in Warangal district.

Tourist spot
The tourism department has proposed the set up of a meditation center on the banks of the lake.

References

Reservoirs in Telangana
Artificial lakes of India